Episoda is the debut album by South African rock band the Parlotones. It was produced by Andrew Lester, and was released on 8 December 2003 on Sovereign Entertainment. The album was recorded during September–October 2003 at Andrew Lester's home studio in Johannesburg; the band paid .

Episoda includes The Parlotones's first radio single, "Long Way Home". The album's release was followed by the group's first regional tour of South Africa.

Track listing

Personnel
Kahn Morbee – lead vocals, rhythm guitar
Paul Hodgson – lead guitar
Glen Hodgson – bass guitar, backing vocals
Neil Pauw – drums
John Boyd – synth

References

2003 debut albums
The Parlotones albums